Yorqishloq is an urban-type settlement in Andijan Region of Uzbekistan. It is part of Jalaquduq District. It lies near the border with Kyrgyzstan, 9 km northwest of Osh. Its population is 7,000 (2016).

References 

Populated places in Andijan Region
Urban-type settlements in Uzbekistan